Vojislav Jakić (1 December 1932 – 8 March 2003) was a Serbian painter, renowned as an outsider artist. His paintings and drawings display phantasmagoric visions of death, insects and human insides. His most significant works are exhibited in the Collection de l'art brut in Lausanne and Museum of Naive and Marginal Art in Jagodina.

Biography 
Vojislav Jakić was born in 1932 in Golem Radobil, North Macedonia which was then part of the Vardar Banovina in the Kingdom of Yugoslavia, where his father worked as a priest, in a severe, religiously devout Serbian Orthodox family. He soon moved to Despotovac in central Serbia, where he would spend most of his life. His childhood was filled with poverty and sadness for the loss of his closest. He moved to Belgrade in 1952 to take drawing and sculpture classes, but feeling disappointed and marginalized, five years later he returned to Despotovac to his mother's home. He married briefly in 1962, but the marriage dissolved and he returned to live with his mother.

Jakić lived in severe poverty during his early career, executing portraits of the dead for local grieving families for meager commissions, working from passport photos. Jakic is known for his later phase of paintings — the abstract works that he began to execute after the dissolution of his marriage around 1969 or 1970. These works are more disturbing and unusual than those which survived from the first phase of his career.  "He drew assiduously on large formats from 1970 onwards. His compositions with ballpoint pens, gouache, and both normal and wax crayons teem with insects, embryonic figures, and human beings."

He died in March 2003 in Despotovac.

Artistic style 

Jakić's subjects are predominantly dark visions of death, carrion, and exposed viscera.  The illustrations that inhabit his paintings intertwine and overlap, creating complex and frightening configurations.  One of his paintings carries the explanation: "This is neither a drawing nor a painting, but a sedimentary deposit of suffering."

Jakić's large, minutely detailed tapestries depict nightmarish visions of death, insects, and human insides. There he finally found his only partner, the rest for his soul and embodiment of his phantasmagoria, yet, his world was apocalyptic, depressing and pessimistic. Under the pressure and restrictions, his figures get together in the universal nightmare. At the end of 1970, he completed his second autobiography entitled Nemenikuće, where the real moments of the experience are intersected with the artist’s fiction and irony.

He transmitted his bitter obsessions and memento mori atmosphere into his 'rolls', as he used to call his endless stories. For one of the longest, he said: "This is neither a drawing nor a painting – it is a condensed sorrow!"  Made of a series of smaller or larger pieces of cartridge paper, they were mostly treated as an uninterrupted compositional thread, like a symbol of tightly bound, unbreakable fastening of the conscience.

That strange, black man, as they used to call him because he permanently wore black, drew attention like unpleasant conscience, a personification of an outcast, a betrayed, while his anthropomorphic and zoomorphic forms exuberated under the radiation of human animosity. Strong linearism of hallucinating, multiplied texture without a beginning and an end creates a unique atmosphere where the powerful presence of the artist’s sensuality and agony is felt. Tubular forms of organic ornaments create unique arabesques abundant with optical effects, either pulling the form deep or drawing it from a flat surface. Jakić used allegory, a symbol, and a metaphor as a means of contemplation. He most often worked in Indian ink, felt pen and less frequently used colour, pastel, or gouache. In addition to drawing, he wrote a conclusion as supplementary media in order to emphasize his observation with the use of a written text. Though Jakić did receive some limited training in his youth, the primarily naive, intuitive, bizarre, pathological, and visionary nature of his style has led to him being classified as an outsider artist, and to his body of work falling under the umbrella of art brut. He is a world classic.

Exhibitions and awards 
Vojislav Jakić had solo and group exhibitions in the country and abroad; he participated in significant international exhibitions among which are Lausanne, 1979, 2000; Jagodina, Museum of Naive and Marginal Art (MNMA), 2001; Cvijeta Zuzorić Art Pavilion in Belgrade, 2002; The Seventh Triennial Insitneho Umenia, Bratislava, 2004; Сentre Culturel de Serbie, Paris,  2007 etc.
He was respected for a long time worldwide and his works are included in permanent exhibitions at the most famous galleries and museums of art brut.

His most significant works are on display in the Collection de l'art brut in Lausanne. On the Tenth International Biennial of Naïve and Marginal Art in 2001, he was awarded Grand Prix for the exhibited works.

Gallery

References

Literature 
 Vojislav Jakic. Exhibition catalogue of the Collection de l’Art Brut. Lausanne : Collection de l’Art Brut, 1979.
 Čelebonović, A., Thévoz M., Jakić V. (1979) Vojislav Jakić. Lausanne: Collection de l'Art Brut
 Publications de la Collection de l’Art Brut, fascicule 10. Text by Aleksa Celebonovic. Lausanne, 1977.
 The End is Near!: Visions of Apocalypse, Millennium and Utopia.  American Visionary Art Museum,1998
 Krstić N. (2014) Outsider Art in Serbia. Jagodina: MNMA

1932 births
2003 deaths
People from Prilep Municipality
Serbs of North Macedonia
20th-century Serbian painters
Outsider artists
Serbian male painters
20th-century Serbian male artists